White Hills is a ski resort located near the town of Clarenville, on the east coast of Newfoundland.

There is currently one fixed grip chair lift to reach the top of the mountain and one magic carpet lift for the beginner hill.

Trails

Lifts

External links
White Hills Resort
Satellite Photo of White Hills
Official Newfoundland and Labrador Tourism Website - White Hills

Ski areas and resorts in Newfoundland